The Salero Formation is a Late Cretaceous geologic formation in the United States. The formation is 70-74 million years old.

See also 

 Stratigraphy
 Volcanism

References

Further reading 
 Sullivan, R.M., and Lucas, S.G. 2006. "The Kirtlandian land-vertebrate "age" – faunal composition, temporal position and biostratigraphic correlation in the nonmarine Upper Cretaceous of western North America." New Mexico Museum of Natural History and Science, Bulletin 35:7-29.

Geologic formations of Arizona
Upper Cretaceous Series of North America
Campanian Stage
Maastrichtian Stage of North America